Galileo is a German television program series produced and broadcast on ProSieben television network. It is also sold to broadcasters in other countries (namely Russia).

The first show was broadcast in 1998, and is now stored in the Arctic World Archive in Svalbard, Norway, after being transferred to special film created by Piql.

Galileo has also a YouTube channel which has more than 3 million subscribers as of September 2020.

Former national rugby player Aiman Abdallah is one of the presenters.

References

External links

Official website (in German)
Galileo on YouTube

1998 German television series debuts
1990s German television series
2000s German television series
2010s German television series
2020s German television series
German television series
German documentary television series